or  is a Japanese slang term for Akihabara style. Akihabara is a district in Chiyoda, Tokyo where many otaku, or obsessive anime, manga, idol, and video game fans gather.

Definition
Akiba-kei is a Japanese slang term meaning "Akihabara style".  It dates back to the early 80s and refers to a subculture of otaku who spend much of their time in and around the Akihabara area of Tokyo and are known for their strong interest in "fantasy worlds...anime, manga, maids, idols, and games". Akiba-kei have also been characterized as being "interested in ruminating about domestic items and creating fan works based on these existing elements."

Location
The Akihabara area in central Tokyo is well known as a marketplace of technology. It has ties to the Japanese video game industry, as well as to anime and manga publishers.

In addition to patronizing the famous electronics stores around them, Akiba-kei frequently open their own shops in Akihabara. Many of these shops are run by Akiba-kei in cosplay, who may claim that such attire is the rule for them rather than the exception. The shops offer a wide variety of goods and services: some sell model or ornamental weaponry; others are modeled after antique reading rooms; and still others sell quirky or innovative foodstuffs.

In popular culture
One distinctive feature of Akiba-kei within Japan's larger popular culture is that, for the most part, they belong to an older generation, who are well-versed in the history of Akihabara before it ever became a center of pop culture. Some of them, affectionately known as "Akiba historians", have worked in and around the Akihabara area for decades and witnessed firsthand the changes the area went through. In addition to running shops and participating vigorously in Akiba-kei culture, they may also be fonts of knowledge about Akihabara and its environs in ways that relate particularly to their areas of interest.

In early 2008, a project was undertaken to attempt to merge some aspects of Akiba-kei culture with Shibuya-kei, Japan's "super-chic internationalist music, fashion, interior, and design movement" that began in Japan in the 1990s. In writing about this project, W. David Marx of Diamond Agency's culture blog observed:

Akiba-kei Idol 

Akiba-kei idols are Japanese idols representing Akihabara style. It is said that the activities of Akiba-kei idols were started by women who were influenced by the style of underground idols created by Aoi Mizuno.

In the 1990s, Akihabara was developing into a neighborhood centered on male otaku interests. However, there were a few women who liked Akihabara, and Haruko Momoi was one of them. Haruko Momoi is also an enthusiastic fan of Aoi Mizuno, who made her debut before Haruko Momoi and completed the style of an underground idol, and started her activities as an underground idol by cosplaying as Shiori Fujisaki, the character of Tokimeki Memorial. Since the cosplay of anime characters and activities as underground idols are characteristics that are widely seen in later Akiba-kei idols, Haruko Momoi is considered the prototype of Akiba-kei idols.

Haruko Momoi, an anison musician, is the first known Akiba-kei idol. Beginning her activities in 1996, Haruko Momoi is still very early in the life cycle of her activity. The tarento Shoko Nakagawa is also an Akiba-kei idol in Japan, starting her activities in 2001. The idol group AKB48, one of Japan's highest selling contemporary musical acts, that began activities in 2005, runs its own theater in Akihabara, from which the group's name is derived. Formed in 2009, Dempagumi.inc has all members claiming to be otaku of some genre. By the time of Dempagumi.inc, the number of Akiba-kei idols had increased considerably. With the spread of otaku culture, it is no longer necessary to distinguish this place by name, so Akiba-kei is becoming a dead language. Therefore, at present, artists who were called Akiba-kei idols in the past are working beyond the framework of Akiba-kei and their activities have also had a great influence on contemporary Japanese culture.

See also

 Geek chic
 Hikikomori
 Otaku

References

Japanese words and phrases
Akihabara